Łupaszka or Łupaszko was nom de guerre of the following persons:
 Jerzy Dąbrowski (Lieutenant Colonel) (1889–1940)
 Zygmunt Szendzielarz (1910–1951)